This is a list of smartphones manufactured by Acer. They either run Android or Windows Mobile.

Liquid

beTouch 

The Acer beTouch is the second smartphone line realized from the company since it the phone manufacturer E-ten in 2009. The series is focused on social networking, with direct links to Facebook, Twitter and other social networks.

E100/101 
The Acer beTouch E100/101 is based on Windows Mobile 6.5 and is powered by 528 MHz CPU. It was released in October 2009.

Main features
Acer beTouch E100/101 is a Windows Mobile (6.5) touchscreen phone. Both feature 3.2-inch WQVGA touch display, 2-megapixel camera, GPS and supports HSDPA networks. The homescreen can be customised with a number of apps and widgets, including the Facebook, Google Search and YouTube applications which come pre-installed. While the beTouch E100 is compatible with networks high speed 3G +, the beTouch E101 it will not work in EDGEmode.

neoTouch 
The Acer neoTouch is a smartphone series is the third smartphone series realized from the company since it acquired phone manufacturer E-ten in 2009, and the first to feature the Windows Mobile 6.5 OS

S200
The Acer neoTouch S200 (also known as Acer neoTouch F1) is a Windows Mobile 6.5 designed for a business use. The Acer neoTouch was launched in October 2009 and is the second phone on the market, after the Toshiba TG01, with a 1 GHz Snapdragon processor.

Features 
The following specifications are those found on the Acer website:
Processing: Qualcomm QSD8250 1 GHz processor
OS: Windows Mobile 6.5 with Internet Explorer 6
Screen: 3.8" WVGA Touchscreen Display with Ambient light sensor
Connectivity: WiFi 802.11 b/g & Bluetooth 2.1
Camera: 5MP autofocus with LEDflash and VGA video recording

Windows Mobile 6.5

Windows 6.5 is an upgrade to Windows Mobile 6.1 that was released to manufacturers on May 11, 2009. This update includes new added features, such as a revamped GUI and a new screen with vertically scrollable labels. It also includes the new Internet Explorer Mobile 6 browser.

P300 

The Acer neoTouch P300 runs Windows Mobile 6.5.3. It was unveiled at the Mobile World Congress 2010 in Barcelona and it is officially available from March 2010. It has a side-slider form factor with QWERTY keyboard and features a WQVGA touchscreen, 3.2MP camera, A-GPS, Wi-Fi and is powered by 528 MHz processor.

Main features
The specifications according to Acer Inc website: 
Keyboard: QWERTY keyboard
OS: Windows Mobile 6.5.3
Processor: Qualcomm 7225 528 MHz
Display: 3.2" WQVGA LCD touch screen
Camera: 3.2 MP with autofocus
Connectivity: 3G UMTS: 2100 MHz; WiFi: 802.11 b/g; Bluetooth 2.0
Battery:Li-Po 970 mAh
Size: 110 × 55 × 15.1 mm
Weight: 130.6 g

P400 

The Acer neoTouch P400 is a smartphone designed by Acer Inc.  After using Android on phones such as the Acer beTouch E110 and Liquid A1, Acer has returned to Microsoft’s operating system. It shares the hardware and design with the Acer beTouch E400 but it runs Microsoft Windows Mobile 6.5.3 operating system  that brings a more finger-friendly user interface. The neoTouch P400 was first introduced at the Mobile World Congress 2010 in Barcelona.

References

External links
 Acer.com
 Acer Official neoTouchS200 site
 Official Acer neoTouch P400 Product Page
 
 

 
Smartphones